Jordan Alexander Tait (born 27 September 1979) is a former professional footballer who began his professional career at Newcastle United FC and played in the English Football League for Darlington and Oldham Athletic. He also played in Scotland for Arbroath, Ross County, Ayr United and St Johnstone F.C.

Working and learning under managers/ coaches such as Kevin Keegan, Sir Kenny Dalglish, Rudd Gullit, John Carver, Alan Irvine and Tommy Burns.Given his first professional contract by Sir Kenny Dalglish in 1998 Tait began coaching while still playing and studied for his UEFA coaching qualifications gaining the UEFA A Licence as well as qualifications in Sport Science and Psychology.Following retirement through injury he moved into full-time coaching and is now a development phase lead coach at Middlesbrough F.C. who are renowned for developing their players.

References

External links

English footballers
Newcastle United F.C. players
Darlington F.C. players
Oldham Athletic A.F.C. players
English Football League players
1979 births
Living people
Arbroath F.C. players
Ross County F.C. players
Ayr United F.C. players
St Johnstone F.C. players
Stenhousemuir F.C. players
Berwick Rangers F.C. players
Scottish Football League players
People from Berwick-upon-Tweed
Footballers from Northumberland
Association football fullbacks